Polycycnis, abbreviated in horticultural trade as Pcn, is a genus of orchid, comprising 17 species found in Central America, and northern South America.

Species
Polycycnis acutiloba Schltr. - Colombia
Polycycnis annectans Dressler - Ecuador
Polycycnis aurita Dressler  - Ecuador, Colombia
Polycycnis barbata (Lindl.) Rchb.f. - Colombia, Venezuela, Panama, Costa Rica, Honduras 
Polycycnis blancoi G.Gerlach - Costa Rica
Polycycnis escobariana G.Gerlach - Colombia
Polycycnis gratiosa Endrés & Rchb.f. - Panama, Costa Rica
Polycycnis grayi Dodson - Ecuador
Polycycnis lehmannii Rolfe - Colombia
Polycycnis lepida Linden & Rchb.f. - Ecuador, Colombia, Peru
Polycycnis muscifera (Lindl. & Paxton) Rchb.f. - Colombia, Venezuela, Panama, Costa Rica, Bolivia, Peru, Ecuador
Polycycnis pfisteri Senghas, Tagges & G.Gerlach - Colombia
Polycycnis silvana F.Barros - Bahia
Polycycnis surinamensis C.Schweinf - Panama, Colombia, Venezuela, Ecuador, Suriname, Guyana 
Polycycnis tortuosa Dressler - Panama
Polycycnis trullifera D.E.Benn. & Christenson - Peru
Polycycnis villegasiana G.Gerlach - Colombia

References

Stanhopeinae genera
Stanhopeinae